Cosmo Clark (24 January 1897 – 7 August 1967) was a British painter. His work was part of the painting event in the art competition at the 1948 Summer Olympics.

References

1897 births
1967 deaths
20th-century British painters
British male painters
Olympic competitors in art competitions
People from Chelsea, London
19th-century British male artists
20th-century British male artists